Deltophora glandiferella is a moth of the family Gelechiidae. It is found in the United States (Texas) and Mexico (Coahuila, Nuevo León, Tamaulipas).

The length of the forewings is 5–7 mm. The forewings are grey or grey-brown, with black markings. Adults have been recorded on wing from April to August and in October.

References

Moths described in 1873
Deltophora